Excoecaria parvifolia is a plant in the Euphorbiaceae family, native to Western Australia, the Northern Territory, and Queensland

It was first described by Johannes Müller Argoviensis in 1864, from a specimen collected by Ferdinand von Mueller in Arnhem Land.

References

External links 

 Excoecaria parvifolia occurrence data from the Australasian Virtual Herbarium

Flora of the Northern Territory
Plants described in 1864
parvifolia
Taxa named by Johannes Müller Argoviensis